Mary Chee Bee Kiang (born 1941) is the wife of former President Tony Tan.

Personal life

Mary met Tony Tan while they were students at the National University of Singapore. They were married on 1 August 1964, and have three sons and one daughter together.

References

1941 births
Living people
First ladies and gentlemen of Singapore